Torelli may refer to:

People
Achille Torelli (1841–1922), Italian playwright
Alec Torelli (born 1987), American professional poker player
Bernard Torelli (1955–2016), French guitarist and audio engineer
Cesare Torelli (died 1615), Italian painter
Felice Torelli, brother of Giuseppe, Baroque painter from Bologna
Filippo di Matteo Torelli (1440–1468), Italian painter and illuminator
Gabriele Torelli (1849–1931), Italian mathematician
Giacomo Torelli (1608–1678), Italian stage designer, engineer, and architect
Giuseppe Torelli, Baroque composer from Bologna
Giuseppe Torelli (mathematician) (1721–1781), Italian mathematician and translator
Ines Torelli (born 1931), Swiss comedian, radio personality, and stage, voice and film actress
Jafet Torelli (dead 1898), Italian ceramist and sculptor
Lot Torelli (1835–1896), Italian sculptor
Lucia Casalini Torelli (1677–1762), Italian painter
Ludovica Torelli (1500–1569), Countess of Guastalla
Luigi Torelli (1810–1887), Italian politician
Mario Torelli (born 1937), scholar of Italic archaeology and culture of the Etruscans
Pomponio Torelli (1539–1608), Count of Montechiarugolo, Italian writer of prose, poetry and plays
Ruggiero Torelli (1884–1915), Italian mathematician
Stefano Torelli (1712–1784), Italian painter

Other
Torelli (Mercogliano), an Italian village in the Province of Avellino, Campania
Torelli Bicycles, 40-year-old custom bicycle and parts manufacturer
Torelli theorem, classical result of algebraic geometry
Onoba torelli, marine gastropod mollusk or micromollusk in the family Rissoidae

See also
 Torello (disambiguation)
 Torella (disambiguation)
 Toro (disambiguation)